The Indian union territory of Ladakh consists of two districts. Each district elects an autonomous district council. Until 31 October 2019, these districts were part of the former state of Jammu and Kashmir.

List

* Indicates area under the actual control of India.

Proposed new districts
Demands have been raised for the creation of new districts in Ladakh.  
There had been 9 proposals to make districts.
local BJP unit has hinted the creation of two new districts: Nubra and Zanskar. The Ladakh Buddhist Association Zanskar (LBAZ) has also been demanding the creation of Zanskar district.

 Nubra: Demands have been raised and the BJP has hinted at the creation of Nubra and Zanskar as new districts.

 Sankoo: In February 2020, organised by various youth, religious and several political parties, nearly 3,000 people protested for the creation of a new  Muslim-majority district of Sankoo out of Kargil because it remains cut-off from Kargil and the rest of India during snowfall of winters. It had 40,000 or more than 25% population of Kargil district in 2011. It lies 42 km southwest of Kargil town.

 Zanskar: People of Zanskar have been demanding for more than past seven decades for a new district from the existing Kargil district.<ref  In 2020, the town's population was 20,000. It lies 250 km south of Kargil town.

 Drass: Some people of Drass subdivision of Kargil district also demanded district status for Drass.
                     
 Changthang: The people of Durbuk and Nyoma subdivisions of Leh district also demanded district status for the region (Changthang is a historical and cultural region of  Ladakh. It is the southern part of Leh district comprising Durbuk and Nyoma subdivisions)

 Khaltsi: The people of Khaltsi, a subdivision of Leh district, have also demanded district status for their region (the western region of Leh district).

Turtuk: Recommendations of mp of Ladakh to upgrade the tehsil of Turtuk. It comprises Turtuk and other towns and siachen glacier.
Aryan valley  of   Ladakh: The people of Aryan valley of Ladakh are demanding either to grant them a subdivision or a district  because  to protect their culture which is different as compared to other part of the  Ladakh.

See also
 List of districts in India
 Geography of Ladakh
 Tourism in Ladakh

References

Lists of districts in India
Ladakh-related lists
Ladakh
Geography of Ladakh